Sweekar Agasthi is an Indian music composer, playback singer, guitarist and audio engineer, who works predominantly in Telugu music. He is best known for composing score and soundtrack of C/o Kancharapalem (2018) and Middle Class Melodies (2020).
He is married to architect, Lahari Pithani, who belongs to the family of politician, Pithani Sathyanarayana, from Andhra Pradesh.

Early life and career 
Sweekar was born in Vijayawada, India into a Telugu-speaking family. He started his career as a vocalist in the Niraval band. In 2014, he started playback singing with the song "2010 Summerlo" from the film Doosukeltha. Before making debut in playback singing, he has worked as an audio engineer. C/o Kancharapalem (2018) was his breakthrough film. Sangeetha Devi Dundoo of The Hindu quoted, "Sweekar Agasthi’s music stayed with me long after the film was over". "Asha Pasham" song from the soundtrack of the film received wide response.

Discography

As composer

Feature films

Other works

As playback singer

Other credited works

Awards and nominations

See also 
 List of Indian playback singers

References

External links 
 
 

Telugu film score composers
21st-century Indian composers
Indian guitarists
Indian audio engineers
Musicians from Vijayawada
People from Krishna district
Living people
Telugu playback singers
Indian male playback singers
21st-century Indian singers
21st-century Indian male singers
1990 births